is a Japanese private secondary school in the Makuhari area, in Mihama-ku, Chiba City, Chiba Prefecture. In terms of the number of students accepted by top national universities, the school is now ranked among the top 10 high schools in Japan.

History
Tetsuo Tamura (田村 哲夫 Tamura Tetsuo) established the school to serve Japanese students who have lived abroad, returned to Japan, and have had difficulties adjusting to the Japanese educational system. Tamura stated that some of the people who he considered to be the most outstanding had received their early education while outside Japan, so he became interested in the education of Japanese people who were returning to Japan after being stationed overseas.

The school opened in 1983 as Makuhari Senior High School. The junior high school opened in 1986.

Notable alumni

Entertainers
Kazutoshi Satō
Kei Tanaka
Kumi of Love Psychedelico
Aiko Kaitou
Thomas Lauderdale (Exchange student)

Athletes

Figure skaters
Narumi Takahashi
Rena Inoue

Soccer players
Marcus Tulio Tanaka
Kota Hattori
Sandro
Josue Souza Santos
Andrey Gustavo dos Santos
André Luíz Baracho
Tiago

Tennis Players
Kyōko Nagatsuka
Takahiro Terachi
Erika Takao

Artists
Yui Haga

Notable staff
Yuta Imazeki

See also

 List of junior high schools in Chiba Prefecture
 Waseda Shibuya Senior High School in Singapore (formerly Shibuya Makuhari Singapore School)

References

External links
 Makuhari Junior and Senior High School
 Makuhari Junior and Senior High School 

Schools in Chiba (city)
High schools in Chiba Prefecture
1983 establishments in Japan
Educational institutions established in 1983